This is a list of the National Register of Historic Places listings in Greenwich, Connecticut.

This is intended to be a complete list of the properties and districts on the National Register of Historic Places in Greenwich. The locations of National Register properties and districts for which the latitude and longitude coordinates are included below, may be seen in an online map.

There are 295 properties and districts listed on the National Register in Fairfield County. This list covers the 35 properties located partially or entirely in Greenwich.  Ones in Bridgeport or Stamford are covered in National Register of Historic Places listings in Bridgeport, Connecticut, or in National Register of Historic Places listings in Stamford, Connecticut.  The remainder are covered in National Register of Historic Places listings in Fairfield County, Connecticut.

Current listings

|}

See also

National Register of Historic Places listings in Fairfield County, Connecticut
National Register of Historic Places listings in Stamford, Connecticut
National Register of Historic Places listings in Bridgeport, Connecticut
List of National Historic Landmarks in Connecticut

References

 Greenwich
History of Fairfield County, Connecticut